Zaozhuang railway station is a railway station in Zaozhuang, Shandong, People's Republic of China. It is served by the Beijing–Shanghai high-speed railway.

Railway stations in Shandong
Railway stations in China opened in 2011